Qilpenlui-ye Sofla (also Romanized as Qīlpenlūī-ye Soflá; also known as Qīl Benlū-ye Soflá, Qīlpenlū-ye Soflá, and Qīl Penlū-ye Soflá) is a village in Naqdi Rural District, Meshgin-e Sharqi District, Meshgin Shahr County, Ardabil Province, Iran. At the 2006 census, its population was 24, in 7 families.

References 

Towns and villages in Meshgin Shahr County